Stanislav Olegovich Lunin (2 May 1993 – 2 June 2021), also known as Islam Dalaev, was a Kazakh professional footballer who played as a right-back.

Career 
On 20 June 2014, Lunin moved from Shakhter Karagandy to FC Kairat, on a 2.5-year contract. Lunin left Kairat on 29 December 2018 at the end of his contract.

On 29 December 2018, Lunin signed with Irtysh Pavlodar.

On 21 August 2019, Lunin returned to FC Shakhter Karagandy.

Death
On 2 June 2021, Lunin passed away after a Cardiac arrest.

Career statistics

Club

International

Honours 
Shakhter Karagandy
 Kazakhstan Premier League: 2012
 Kazakhstan Cup: 2013, 2014
 Kazakhstan Super Cup: 2013

Kairat
 Kazakhstan Cup: 2014, 2015, 2017

References

1993 births
2021 deaths
Kazakhstani people of Russian descent
Kazakhstani footballers
Kazakhstan under-21 international footballers
Kazakhstan international footballers
Kazakhstan Premier League players
FC Vostok players
FC Shakhter Karagandy players
FC Kairat players
FC Irtysh Pavlodar players
Place of birth missing
Association football defenders
Sportspeople from Oskemen